Cassis tessellata, common name : the West African helmet, is a species of large sea snail, a marine gastropod mollusk in the family Cassidae, the helmet snails and bonnet snails.

Description
The shell is cone-shaped with a flattened apex, light with darker symmetrical spots. On the outer surface are small short spikes. The siphon (short and narrow) is strongly bent back. From the side of the mouth, the shell is white. The size of an adult shell varies between 66 mm and 300 mm.

Distribution
This species occurs in the Caribbean Sea and in the Atlantic Ocean along Cape Verde and from Senegal to Angola.

References

 Gofas, S.; Afonso, J.P.; Brandào, M. (Ed.). (S.a.). Conchas e Moluscos de Angola = Coquillages et Mollusques d'Angola. [Shells and molluscs of Angola]. Universidade Agostinho / Elf Aquitaine Angola: Angola. 140 pp
 Dautzenberg, Ph. (1929). Mollusques testacés marins de Madagascar. Faune des Colonies Francaises, Tome III
 Bernard, P.A. (Ed.) (1984). Coquillages du Gabon [Shells of Gabon]. Pierre A. Bernard: Libreville, Gabon. 140, 75 plates pp.
 Rolán E., 2005. Malacological Fauna From The Cape Verde Archipelago. Part 1, Polyplacophora and Gastropoda.

External links
 
 
 

Cassidae
Gastropods described in 1791
Taxa named by Johann Friedrich Gmelin
Molluscs of the Atlantic Ocean
Molluscs of Angola
Gastropods of Cape Verde
Invertebrates of Gabon
Invertebrates of West Africa